Nicolas Grunitzky (5 April 1913 – 27 September 1969) was the second president of Togo and its third head of state. He was President from 1963 to 1967. Grunitzky was Prime Minister of Togo from 1956 to 1958 under the French Colonial loi cadre system, which created a limited "national" government in their colonial possessions.  He was elected Prime Minister of Togo —still under French administration— in 1956. Following the 1963 coup which killed his nationalist political rival and brother-in-law Sylvanus Olympio, Grunitzky was chosen by the military committee of coup leaders to be Togo's second President.

Biography 
He was born in Atakpamé in 1913 to a German father and a Togolese mother (of Yoruba royalty). He studied civil engineering at the ESTP in Paris and was a public administrator before leaving to form his own company. He was the secretary-general of the Togolese Party of Progress and was elected into the Togolese Representative Assembly in 1951. Grunitzky also served in the French National Assembly from 1951 to 1958, winning elections in 1951 and 1956. Supported by France, he became the Prime Minister of the Republic of Togo on September 12, 1956. The PTP and its northern ally, the Union of Chiefs and Peoples of the North, were defeated in elections held on May 16, 1958 by Sylvanus Olympio's Committee of Togolese Unity (CUT) and their nationalist allies Juvento, and Grunitzky subsequently went into exile.

The CUT/JUVENTO government declared Togo's independence on April 27, 1960, and Olympio (Grunitzky's chief political rival and brother-in-law) was elected the first president of independent Togo. Following a coup d'état in 1963 that ended with the assassination of President Olympio, Grunitzky was appointed president by the "Insurrection Committee" headed by Emmanuel Bodjollé. This was the first military coup in Western Africa following independence, and was organized by a group of soldiers under the direction of Sergeant Étienne Gnassingbé Eyadema. Grunitzky attempted to unify the country by including several political parties in his government. He was, however, toppled in a bloodless military coup led by now-Lt. Col Étienne Gnassingbé Eyadema and was exiled to Paris.

He was injured in a car accident in Côte d'Ivoire, and died from complications in a hospital in Paris in 1969.

References 

 Nicolas GRUNITZKY (1913–1969)  Base de données des députés français depuis 1789 assemblee-nationale.fr (Biography at French National Assembly)
 Bridgette Kasuka. Prominent African Leaders Since Independence. Bankole Kamara Taylor (2012) 
 Frédéric Joël Aivo. Le président de la république en Afrique noire francophone: genèse, mutations et avenir de la fonction. L'Harmattan (2007) 
 GAYIBOR Nicoué. Histoire des Togolais. Des origines aux années 1960 (Tome 4 : Le refus de l'ordre colonial). KARTHALA Editions (2011)

External links 

Much of the content of this article comes from the equivalent French-language Wikipedia article (retrieved 27 May 2005).

1913 births
1969 deaths
People from Plateaux Region, Togo
People of French West Africa
Togolese people of Polish descent
Togolese people of German descent
Yoruba royalty
Yoruba politicians
Prime Ministers of Togo
Presidents of Togo
Deputies of the 2nd National Assembly of the French Fourth Republic
Deputies of the 3rd National Assembly of the French Fourth Republic
Leaders ousted by a coup
Road incident deaths in France